Hypsopygia angulifascialis is a species of snout moth in the genus Hypsopygia. It was described by Aristide Caradja in 1932. It is found in China.

References

Moths described in 1932
Pyralini
Taxa named by Aristide Caradja